Hypercementosis is an idiopathic, non-neoplastic condition characterized by the excessive buildup of normal cementum (calcified tissue) on the roots of one or more teeth. A thicker layer of cementum can give the tooth an enlarged appearance, which mainly occurs at the apex or apices of the tooth.

Signs and symptoms
It is experienced as an uncomfortable sensation in the tooth, followed by an aching pain.

It may be shown on radiographs as a radiopaque (or lighter) mass at each root apex.

Cause
Can be caused by many things. A way to remember the causes is "PIG ON TAP"

Local factors- 
 Occlusal Trauma
 Trauma
 Non-functional tooth
 Unopposed tooth (and impacted teeth, embedded teeth, teeth without antagonists)
Systemic factors-
 Idiopathic
 Pituitary Gigantism
 Paget's Disease
 Acromegaly
 Periapical granuloma
 Arthritis
 Calcinosis
 Rheumatic fever

It may be one of the complications of Paget's disease of bone in the form of generalized hypercementosis.

It may also be a compensatory mechanism in response to attrition to increase occlusal tooth height.

Complications
Such deposits form bulbous enlargements on the roots and may interfere with extractions, especially if adjacent teeth become fused (concrescence). It may also result in pulpal necrosis by blocking blood supply via the apical foramen.

References

External links 

Periodontal disorders